Jay Marchant (January 7, 1888 – June 14, 1962) was an American film director and actor of the silent era. He directed 22 films between 1921 and 1925, including five film serials for the Universal Film Manufacturing Company. He was born in Tripp County, South Dakota and died in Los Angeles County, California.

Selected filmography
 King of the Circus (1920)
 Do or Die (1921)
 Perils of the Yukon (1922)
 The Ghost City (1923)
 The Iron Man (1924)
 The Great Circus Mystery (1925)
 The Fighting Ranger (1925)
 The Great Sensation (1925)

External links

1888 births
1962 deaths
American film directors
American male film actors
American male silent film actors
20th-century American male actors
Male actors from South Dakota